Boris Gurevich may refer to:

Boris Gurevich (wrestler, born 1931), Soviet Olympic wrestler
Boris Gurevich (wrestler, born 1937), Soviet Olympic wrestler